Félix Alejandro Barón Castillo (born 7 November 1991) is a Colombian road and track cyclist, who currently rides for UCI Continental team . He competed in the individual pursuit event at the 2011 UCI Track Cycling World Championships.

Major results
2008
 Pan American Junior Road Championships
1st Road race
2nd Time trial
2010
 1st  Time trial, National Under-23 Road Championships
 1st Stage 1 Vuelta al Tolima
2013
 2nd Time trial, National Under-23 Road Championships
 Pan American Under-23 Road Championships
3rd Road race
6th Time trial
2018
 10th Overall Tour of Thailand

References

External links

1991 births
Living people
Colombian track cyclists
Colombian male cyclists
Place of birth missing (living people)
20th-century Colombian people
21st-century Colombian people